Pudgy may refer to

 John "Pudgy" Dunn (1896–1937), American gangster
 Abbye "Pudgy" Stockton (1917–2006), American professional strongwoman 
 Pudgy the Puppy, an animated character in Betty Boop films

Lists of people by nickname